This is a list of Hum Awards ceremonies.  This list is current as of the 4th Hum Awards ceremony held on April 23 while the televising date is to be announced.

Venues and networks

Venues
 2013 - 2014: Expo Center, Karachi, Sindh, Pakistan.
 2015: Dubai World Trade Center, Dubai, UAE.
 2016–present: Expo Center, Karachi, Sindh, Pakistan.

Networks

 2013: Hum Network Limited, Hum TV and Hum Europe

Ceremonies 
All award times local (PST/UTC+5).

Notes

Hosts of ceremonies

Hum Awards are presented by a pair of hosts for each segment including Television, Music and Fashion who called presenters to give away the awards. However for special category or Honorary awards only one individual represents the segment. Host of First Segment are considered as main hosts, while others regarded as co-hosts.

Co-Hosts
Following is the list of Hosts that co-hosted the ceremonies with main host.

Multiple Ceremonies Hosted
The following 3 individuals have hosted (or co-hosted) the Hum Awards ceremony on two or more occasions.

Nominated Hosts

The following individuals have hosted (or co-hosted) the Hum Awards ceremony for the same year in which the individual was also a nominee.

See also
 Hum Awards
 Hum Awards pre-show
 Hum Award for Best Drama Serial

References

External links
Official websites
 Hum Awards official website
Other resources
 

 5th Hum Awards QMobile HUM Style Awards 2017

 
Hum